The Yamaha SR250 is a single cylinder motorcycle made by Yamaha Motor Company initially from 1980 to 1984 and then 2001 to 2004 for a second generation. It shares styling with the larger Yamaha SR500.

History
The SR250 was produced from 1980 to 1982 in the United States, as well as from 1982 to 2002 in Spain, in two versions. While it has stylistic similarities with its older brothers the SR500 and SR400, the SR250 is very much a commuter bike.

2001 model

In 2001, Yamaha released their most recent SR250 due to popular demand for reliable commuters. This model is modeled after the SR500. Despite sharing the SR designation, these bikes are very different.  The engines are different in the most fundamental sense and the frames are also very different - no seat or tank components are interchangeable without frame modification.

Notes

External links

SR250